Laugh??? I Nearly Paid My Licence Fee was a 1984 BBC 2 sketch show starring Robbie Coltrane, John Sessions, Ron Bain and Louise Gold. The programme, which was an experiment with a new format following the success of A Kick Up the Eighties, ran for a single series of six episodes.

The series is notable for featuring the television debut of Elaine C. Smith.

References

External links 

Laugh??? I Nearly Paid My Licence Fee! at BBC Genome Project

1984 British television series debuts
1984 British television series endings
1980s British television sketch shows
BBC television sketch shows
BBC television comedy
English-language television shows